The 2001 New Year Honours in New Zealand were appointments by Elizabeth II in her right as Queen of New Zealand, on the advice of the New Zealand government, to various orders and honours to reward and highlight good works by New Zealanders, and to celebrate the passing of 2000 and the beginning of 2001. They were announced on 30 December 2000.

The recipients of honours are displayed here as they were styled before their new honour.

New Zealand Order of Merit

Principal Companion (PCNZM)
Emeritus Professor Lloyd George Geering  – of Wellington. For services to religious studies.

Distinguished Companion (DCNZM)
 Jocelyn Barbara Fish   – of Hamilton. For services to women and the community.
 The Right Honourable Thomas Munro Gault – of Auckland. For services as a judge of the Court of Appeal.
 Sister Patricia Mary Hook – of Auckland. For services to nursing and the community.
 Professor Alan Francis Mark  – of Dunedin. For services to conservation.
 Colin Earl Meads  – of Te Kūiti. For services to rugby and the community.

Companion (CNZM)
 Jill Edwina Amos  – of Auckland. For services to the community.
 Druiscilla Kapu Barrett – of Whangārei. For services to Māori and the community.
 Dr Allan Gordon Cumming  – of Palmerston North. For services to medicine, health administration and the community.
 Professor Mason Harold Durie – of Feilding. For services to Māori.
 Dr John Norman Harré – of Auckland. For services to education.
 The Honourable (Cedric) Russell Marshall – of Wellington. For public services.
 Dorothy Frances Meyer – of North Shore City. For services to women.
 Richard Frederick Nottage – of Wellington. For services as Secretary of Foreign Affairs and Trade, 1991–1999.
 Associate Professor Peter Robert Skelton – of Christchurch. For services to environmental law.
 Iritana Te Rangi Tāwhiwhirangi  – of Featherston. For services to Māori education.
 Anthony Ernest Walton – of Auckland. For services to the deaf.
 Professor Albert Wendt – of Auckland. For services to literature.

Officer (ONZM)
 John Stanley Body – of Wellington. For services to music, photography and education.
 Riwia Brown – of Paekākāriki. For services to theatre and film.
 Dorothy Quita Buchanan – of Eastbourne. For services to music.
 Barry Vickerman Cleavin – of Christchurch. For services to the arts.
 Candis Eileen Craven – of Auckland. For services to health education.
 Dr Catherine Frances (Kate) Dewes – of Christchurch. For services to the peace movement.
 Graeme Dingle  – of Leigh. For services to youth.
 Emeritus Professor Robert Wallace Ellis – of Auckland. For services to fine arts.
 Walter Fowlie – of Patea. For services to mountaineering.
 Leigh Helen Gibbs – of Gisborne. For services to netball.
 Gaewyn Elizabeth Griffiths – of Auckland. For services to education.
 Air Commodore John Henry Staples Hamilton  – Royal New Zealand Air Force.
 Dr Michael David Henry Holdaway – of Dunedin. For services to children and medical research.
 Richard John Hubbard – of Auckland. For services to business and the community.
 Lorna Ani McIntosh – of Auckland. For services to commerce and the community.
 Dorothy Catherine Matthews – of Nelson. For services to local-body and community affairs.
 John Bentley Morrison – of Wellington. For services to the arts.
 Garry Peter Nash – of Auckland. For services to glass art.
 Patricia Katherine Payne – of Roxburgh. For services to opera and the community.
 Professor Emeritus James Ernest Ritchie – of Raglan. For services to the Māori people and education.
 Gerald Ryan – of Auckland. For services to racing, rugby league and the community.
 Sally Mavis Sloman – of Auckland. For services to opera.
 Jane Ann Thomson – of Dunedin. For services to literature.
 Robert Norman Waddell – of Cambridge. For services to rowing.
 James Hay Wallace – of Auckland. For services to the arts.

Additional
 Acting Lieutenant Colonel John Christopher Flanagan – Corps of Royal New Zealand Engineers.
 Lieutenant Colonel Gordon Kyle Milward – of Carterton; Royal New Zealand Infantry Regiment.

Honorary
 Fatu Akelei Feu'u (Poutasi Falealili) – of Auckland. For services to art.
 Gerd le Bell – of Egestorf, Federal Republic of Germany. For services to New Zealand interests in Germany.
 Ikuo Matsui – of Hokkaido, Japan. For services to New Zealand interests in Japan.

Member (MNZM)
 Alexander John Adams – of Christchurch. For services to flood risk management.
 The Reverend Mark Thomas Beale – of Auckland. For services to the community.
 Hori George Te Takinga Bennett – of Rotorua. For services to broadcasting.
 Lieutenant Colonel (Rtd) Lawrence Morris Blyth   – of Auckland. For services to war veterans and the community.
 Rowan James Brassey – of Auckland. For services to bowls.
 Robin Edwin Brassington – of Levin. For services to education and the community.
 Errol Freeman Brathwaite – of Christchurch. For services to literature.
 Colleen Brenda Brown  – of Auckland. For services to the community.
 Raymond Daniel Cody – of Auckland. For services to sports broadcasting and the community.
 Roderick William Coleman – of Wanganui. For services to motorcycling.
 Pamela Ann Collings – of Rangiora. For services to aviation.
 Gael Marion Collins  – of Auckland. For services to the community.
 Jayne Craike – of Auckland. For services to equestrian sport.
 Dr Leslie Ding – of Christchurch. For services to medicine and the community.
 Danae Clare Goosman – of Christchurch. For services to sport.
 William Morris Gosden – of Wellington. For services to film festivals.
 Richard John Hayes – of Te Anau. For services to search and rescue operations.
 George William Neil Johansen  – of Palmerston North. For services to the community.
 Derek George Jones – of Christchurch. For services to harness racing.
 Leilani Joyce – of Hamilton. For services to squash.
 David Auld Kilgour – of Dunedin. For services to music.
 Lineahi Siale Fanovaha Lund – of Auckland. For services to the Niuean community.
 Lindsay Albert George McCallum – of Waikanae. For services to the business community.
 David Francis MacCalman – of Katikati. For services to sport.
 Ronald Bruce McNaughton  – of Auckland. For services to local government and the community.
 Donald Eugene McRae  – of Christchurch. For services to welfare.
 Ronald Wallace Messenger – of Greymouth. For services to sport and the community.
 Jagdish Chandra Natali  – of Auckland. For services to the community.
 Desmond Joseph Nolan – of Haast. For services to aviation and the community.
 Ou Lu – of Lower Hutt. For services to ballet.
 Fuimaono Karl Pulotu-Endemann  – of Wellington. For services to public health.
 George Paramena Rehu – of Rotorua. For services to returned services personnel.
 Audrey Reynolds – of Paraparaumu. For services to the community.
 Heather Jean Robson – of Auckland. For services to racquet sports.
 Dr Barbara Louise Ryan – of Eastbourne. For services to women and the community.
 Wesley Arthur Ryan – of Christchurch. For services to conservation.
 David George Scott – of Ohakune. For services to the community.
 Henry William Dickens Skidmore  – of Te Aroha. For services to local body and community affairs.
 Dr Allan Gibson Smith – of Porirua City. For services to community medicine.
 John Campbell Thomas – of Waikouaiti. For services to theatre.
 Richard Gwynne Trimble – of Auckland. Superintendent, New Zealand Police.
 David Tua (Mafaufau Sita) – of Auckland. For services to boxing.
 Ruth Jasmine Underhill  – of Porirua City. For services to local body and community affairs.
 Gina Louise Weber – of Waitakere City. For services to softball.
 Michael Donald Worth  – of Tokoroa. For services to local-body and community affairs.
 Walter Denzil Wyatt – of Auckland. For services to Korea veterans.
 Lieutenant Colonel Charles Alexander Sylvester Lott – Royal New Zealand Army Logistic Regiment.
 Warrant Officer Marine Technical (Propulsion) Paul Andrew Coleman – Royal New Zealand Navy.
 Warrant Officer John Paul Fleming – Royal New Zealand Air Force.
 Chief Petty Officer Seaman George Taranaki McGarvey – Royal New Zealand Navy.

Additional
 Lieutenant Commander Shaun Thomas Fogarty – Royal New Zealand Navy.
 Major Peter Te Aroha Emile Kelly – Royal New Zealand Infantry Regiment.
 Squadron Leader Mark David Cook – Royal New Zealand Air Force.
 Warrant Officer Class One Peter Bowyer – Royal New Zealand Infantry Regiment.
 Staff Sergeant Shane Geoffrey Vooght – The Corps of Royal New Zealand Engineers.

Honorary
 Maria Magdalena Westenberg Tibbe – of Christchurch. For services to women.

Companion of the Queen's Service Order (QSO)

For community service
 The Reverend Canon Te Rua Moera Anderson – of Ōtorohanga.
 Dr (Mohammad) Ashraf Choudhary  – of Palmerston North.
 Denis Scott Currie – of Papakura.
 Ruth Seline Filler – of Auckland.
 (Hohi Ngapera Te Moana) Keri Kaa – of Tikitiki.
 Anna Maria (Maree) Millar  – of Whangārei.
 Marcia Dawn Read – of Auckland.

For public services
 Paul Stephen Carpinter – of Christchurch.
 Dr David George Chaplow – of Auckland.
 Roma Miringa Cook  – of Rotorua.
 James Michael Fenton – of Invercargill.
 Dr Stuart Peter Gowland – of Christchurch.
 Margaret Constance Long – of Ōtaki.
 Dr (Ralph Heberley) Ngātata Love  – of Petone.

Queen's Service Medal (QSM)

For community service
 Lillian Patricia Anderson – of Auckland.
 Trevor William Andrews – of Hamilton.
 Indu Bajaj – of Auckland.
 Richard James Blundell – of Napier.
 Raena Clark  – of Waitakere City.
 James Albert Dangerfield – of Dunedin.
 Margaret Jane Cleland Donnelley – of Levin.
 Janet Elizabeth Emery  – of Napier.
 Kathleen Evans – of Levin.
 Maria Matalena George – of Ōtara.
 Irene Denise Green – of Matamata.
 Kenneth Raymond Greenslade – of Queenstown.
 Margaret Louisa Hansen  – of Auckland.
 Janet Athalie Henderson – of Hamilton.
 Brian Kenneth Hudson – of Porirua City.
 Rosemary Gertrude Hudson – of Porirua City.
 Shirley Kilgour – of Blenheim.
 Donald John McFarlane – of Christchurch.
 Jean Frances Mapson – of Ngatea.
 (Margaret) Joan Massey  – of Waiuku.
 Tuarangi Michael Toki – of Waitakere City.
 The Reverend Father Roderick Milne – of Ōtaki.
 Rodney Mark Ottaway – of Kaiwaka.
 Livinia Margaret Paterson – of Cromwell.
 Barbara Elizabeth Phillipps – of Dunedin.
 Honor Rickard – of Rangitukia.
 Eunice May Riddle – of Pukekohe.
 Annette Rutter – of Manukau City.
 Constance Sager – of Putāruru.
 Anne Rachael Sayers – of Hamilton.
 Elwyn Margaret Wynn Stevens – of Palmerston North.
 Edward Taylor – of Auckland.
 Barry John Veale – of Hokitika.
 Helen Alison Weggery – of Tokomaru.
 Lorraine Margeret Wilson  – of Auckland.

For public services
 Leota John Ahdar – of Christchurch.
 Graeme Alexander Anderson – of Alexandra.
 Noel Bertrand Briggs – of Ashburton.
 Victor Joseph Brown – of Ngunguru; chief fire officer, Tutukaka Coast Volunteer Fire Brigade, New Zealand Fire Service.
 Margaret Jean Christensen – of Masterton.
 Derek Davison – of Auckland; inspector, New Zealand Police.
 Thelma Joyce Fagan – of Taupō.
 Daphne May Fairbairn – of Auckland.
 The Reverend Penelope Pamela Fisher – of Lower Hutt.
 Peter Graham Gilroy – of Christchurch; detective, New Zealand Police.
 Raymond Fredric Harris – of Wellington.
 John Vernon Head – of Wellington.
 Margaret Neilson (Tilly) Hunter – of Wellington.
 Margaret Hursthouse – of Havelock North.
 Desmond Usher Kearns  – of Otipua, Timaru.
 William Alexander King  – of Wānaka.
 Ian Duncan McDonald – of Paraparaumu Beach.
 Cliff Webster Mears – of Waitakere City; assistant fire region commander, Auckland, New Zealand Fire Service.
 Ian Powell – of Paekākāriki.
 Derek Newell Quickfall – of New Plymouth.
 Laxmi Rania – of Lower Hutt.
 David Harold Robertson – of Auckland.
 Brenda Gail Robinson – of North Shore City.
 Margery Ann Scott – of Auckland.
 Nona Leonce Smith (Sister Marianne Smith) – of Auckland.
 Dorothy Jean Southon – of Auckland.
 Eileen Edna Stevens – of Waihi Beach.
 Ian Walter Stewart – of Auckland.
 Warren Nils Strand – of Kumeū.
 John (Jack) Alexander Walker – of Wellington.
 Marion Elizabeth Wellington – of Waitara.
 Patrick William Whiu – of Kerikeri; senior constable, New Zealand Police.
 Thomas Barry Wilson  – of Napier.
 Lindsay John Campbell Wright – of Kaitangata.

References

New Year Honours
2001 awards
2001 in New Zealand
New Zealand awards